Argelia is a town and municipality in Antioquia Department, Colombia. Part of the subregion of Eastern Antioquia.

Climate
Argelia has a tropical rainforest climate (Af) which closely borders a subtropical highland climate. It has very heavy rainfall year round.

See also 
St Julian's Church, Argelia

References

Municipalities of Antioquia Department